Teshi may refer to:

Drupka Teshi, Buddhist festival 
Teshie, city on the coast of Ghana east of Accra